Vithal Laxman Kotwal (alias Bhai)  was a social reformer and revolutionary from Neral, Maharashtra, India. He laid down his life in the freedom struggle of the country. He was killed in an encounter with the British police officer DSP R. Hall while he was underground with his team in the jungle of Sidhagadh on 2 January 1943.

Early life 
Vithal Kotwal was born on 1 December 1912 in Matheran, a hill station near Mumbai, in the district Raigad. He belonged to the poor barber family. He stayed there till the fourth grade when he studied in the local school and returned only after he graduated from Pune in 1936. He was the eldest and had three sisters.

Education 
After studying till fourth grade in the local school, he shifted to Pune to her aunt Gaurutai Halde, where he stayed till he completed his graduation from Wadia college. He stood first in the entire Pune district in his Vernacular Metric exam.
After he returned to his native place, he studied law in Mumbai and became advocate in 1941.

Family 
Vithal Kotwal was married to Indu Tirlapurkar from Pune in 1935. He had a boy named Bharat who died at the age of 22. His daughter Jagruti died within two months when Mr. Kotwal was underground in 1942. His wife Indu Kotwal died in 2012 at the age of 91.

Social Work 
As soon as Vithal Kotwal returned to Matheran he got into socio political activities defying his father’s wish to carry on their family tradition. He began helping people when cyclone hit entire western Mumbai shore and fisherman community got displaced. Later in coordination with the local congress leader Rajaram alias Bhausaheb Raut, he got involved in politics and social work.
He helped creating and enrolling common people in the voters’ list in the Matheran area. When he came across to see that landlords cheat peasants due to their ignorance he stated voluntary school for the children of these farmers. He altogether started 42 such schools in the area.
Later, when landlords denied food grain to the farmers at the time of drought, Vithal Kotwal came up with the innovative idea of grain bank for the farmers. With the financial support of Mr. Raut, a few thousand kilos of grain were imported and distributed amongst the farmers. Whoever took a grain loan had to replace it with twenty-five percent extra; whereas the landlords used to charge them double the loan.
Later when he became an advocate he served the poor peasants and downtrodden to fight for their right against the landlords who exploited them.
In 1940 he organized a peasants and workers congregation in Karjat where prominent political activists of the time Achyutrao Patwardhan, S. M. Joshi, Lalji Pendse attended.

Political career 
Vithal Kotwal successfully fought the election for Matheran city council and became vice chairman in 1941.

Freedom struggle 
Though motivated for the freedom struggle from his college days in Pune, Vithal became influenced by socio communist movement in the country. Hence he was called "Bhai" as an Indian synonym for comrade. He got fully involved and went underground when Mahatma Gandhi on 9 August 1942 asked British to "quit India".  After the arrest of all the major leaders in India, an arrest warrant was also issued in the name of Bhai Kotwal. He went underground the same day, vowing to either "live in my free country or in the heaven". He was vice chairman of Matheran then.

Kotwal Dasta 
While underground he formed group of underground mercenaries called "Kotwal Dasta", a parallel government in the Karjat taluka of Raigad district. They were about 50 in numbers including farmers and voluntary school teachers and his cousin brothers Pentanna and Dattoba Halde. They decided to cut down the electric pylons supplying electricity to Mumbai city. From September 1942 through November 1942 they felled 11 pylons, paralyzing the industries and railways.

To counter the menace police announced cash award of rupees 2500 leading to the arrest of Bhai Kotwal. Also a special officer DSP R. Hall and Officer Stafford were called to counter Bhai Kotwal.

When the Krantikari Kotwal Dasta was hiding in the remote jungle of Sidhgadh in Murbad Taluka, he sent a letter for help which fell into the hands of one of the landlords of the area, who turned the letter and the messenger over to Officer Hall.
Krantikari says its Indian soldier

Final encounter 
On 2 January 1943 early morning when the Azad Dasta was preparing to shift to another safe place and was waiting for the help to come, R. Hall and Stafford attacked the Dasta members. First to fall was the young Hiraji Patil, son of deputy leader of Azad Dasta Gomaji Patil. Hiraji died on the spot. Bhai Kotwal got injured in the thigh and could not move. Hall killed him point blank.

He was one of the many lesser known freedom fighters who laid down their lives for the freedom of the country. For his brave fight and sacrifice he is now proudly called "Veer Bhai Kotwal", meaning warrior.

In popular culture 
On 24 January 2020,a film was released on the life of Bhai Kotwal titled Shaheed Bhai Kotwal.

References 

1912 births
1943 deaths
People from Raigad district
Indian communists